The 1914 Rutgers Queensmen football team represented Rutgers University as an independent during the 1914 college football season. In their second season under head coach George Sanford, the Queensmen compiled a 5–3–1 record and outscored their opponents, 208 to 73.  Coach Sanford was inducted into the College Football Hall of Fame in 1971.

Schedule

References

Rutgers
Rutgers Scarlet Knights football seasons
Rutgers Queensmen football